Stempfferia sylviae is a butterfly in the family Lycaenidae. It is found in the Republic of the Congo, the Central African Republic, the Democratic Republic of the Congo and Uganda.

References

Butterflies described in 1999
Poritiinae